Thad Kojo Mensah (born April 1, 1985) is a Ghanaian former professional basketball player.

In 2015-16, he played for Esporte Clube Vitória of the Novo Basquete Brasil.

His last team as an active player was Nauticos of Mazatlan of the Circuito de Baloncesto de la Costa del Pacífico.

Accomplishments
 2010 Venezuelan LPB All-Star Game
 2013 Novo Basquete Brasil Champion

References

External links
 ESPN profile
 Duquesne profile

1985 births
Living people
Ghanaian expatriate sportspeople in Brazil
Ghanaian expatriate sportspeople in Mexico
Ghanaian men's basketball players
Guards (basketball)
Duquesne Dukes men's basketball players
Esporte Clube Vitória basketball players